In enzymology, a steryl-beta-glucosidase is an enzyme that catalyzes the chemical reaction

cholesteryl-beta-D-glucoside + H2O  D-glucose + cholesterol

Thus, the two substrates of this enzyme are cholesteryl-beta-D-glucoside and H2O, whereas its two products are D-glucose and cholesterol.

This enzyme belongs to the family of hydrolases, specifically those glycosidases that hydrolyse O- and S-glycosyl compounds.  The systematic name of this enzyme class is cholesteryl-beta-D-glucoside glucohydrolase.

References

 

EC 3.2.1
Enzymes of unknown structure